Higher is the second studio album by the five-piece British-Irish doo-wop boy band The Overtones. The album was released on 1 October 2012 in the UK via Rhino Entertainment. The album was preceded by the release of the lead single, "Loving the Sound". The band worked with a number of well-known producers on the album, including Trevor Horn, Walter Afanasieff and Steve Robson, as well as production team Future Cut, who produced most of the original tracks on the album.

Promotion
On 29 September 2012 the band appeared on an episode of Red or Black?, appearing as part of a challenge involving using a handkerchief in their performance. They performed three songs in a medley, including the album's lead single "Loving the Sound". On 9 December 2012 they appeared as special guest performers in the final episode of the ninth series of The Xtra Factor. Despite not being a single from the album, "Runaround Sue" has been a staple of the band's live set since its inception and is one of the crowd favourites on tour. On 4 October 2012, Higher entered the Irish Albums Chart at #19, before entering the UK Albums Chart at #6 two days later, becoming the band's second top ten album in the UK.

Singles
 "Loving the Sound" was released as the lead single from the album on 14 September 2012. It charted at 100 on the Official UK Charts on 7 October 2012 and became their second top 100 single to date. The band promoted the song with performances on The National Lottery, This Morning and The Xtra Factor.
 "Higher" was released as the second single from the album on 30 November 2012. It was the second original song to be released as a single from the album. The track was co-written by the band and Steve Booker and produced by Future Cut.
 "Love Song" was released as the third and final single from the album on 18 February 2013. It was the third original song to be released as a single from the album. The track was again co-written by the band and produced by Future Cut.

Track listing

Charts

Weekly charts

Year-end charts

Release history

References

2012 albums
The Overtones albums